Dave LaMattina (born 31 May 1980), is an American filmmaker. He is best known as the director of documentaries Brownstones to Red Dirt, We Must Go and I Am Big Bird: The Caroll Spinney Story.

Personal life
He was born on 31 May 1980 in New York City, United States.

Career
Before directing documentaries, he started to work as a production manager for the blockbuster films Ice Age: Dawn of the Dinosaurs, Epic and Rio. Then in 2008, he became the writer of the short film Moonrock & Lighter Fluid. In 2009, he became the director assistant for the film Horton Hears a Who!. In 2010, he made his directorial debut with the documentary Brownstones to Red Dirt. The film revolves around some children in Brooklyn become pen pals with orphans from Sierra Leone. After the success of the documentary, he made his second documentary Kei.

Then in 2014, he made I Am Big Bird: The Caroll Spinney Story along with Chad N. Walker. The film has received generally favorable reviews. In 2014, he won the Audience Choice Award for the Best Documentary at Cinéfest Sudbury International Film Festival for the film.

He graduated with a degree in communications from Boston College. Later he received a grant from the Jacques Salmanowitz Program for Moral Courage in Documentary Film. With the initiative Jacques Salmanowitz Program, LaMattina direct and produce a documentary about child AIDS activist Nkosi Johnson, which became his directorial debut. Meanwhile, he earned his MFA from the University of Southern California's School of Cinema-Television.

After the graduation, he spent time writing and working in development with Hollywood studios. In 2007, he co-founded the documentary film production house, 'Copper Pot Pictures' accompany with Chad N. Walker and Clay Frost.

Filmography

References

External links
 

Living people
1980 births
People from New York City
American film directors